Charles Prescott may refer to:

 Charles John Prescott (1857–1946), English born Australian army chaplain, Methodist minister and headmaster
 Charles Ramage Prescott (1772–1859), merchant, noted horticulturalist and political figure in Nova Scotia
 Charles Y. Prescott (born 1938), American particle physicist